The  was the first dynasty in the traditional historiography of the Ryukyu Islands. According to the Ryukyuan creation myth, the Heavenly Emperor (天帝), who lived in the Heavenly Gusuku (天城), ordered Amamikyu to create the Ryukyu Islands. Without sexual intercourse, she became pregnant by a male deity, Shinerikyu, and populated the islands. Generations of mankind lived in caves and fields. The Chūzan Seikan claimed that the Tenson dynasty had twenty-five kings and ruled for seventeen thousand years. The last king was assassinated and usurped by a powerful official named Riyū (利勇), and later, Riyū was overthrown by Shunten, the lord of Urasoe, who established the Shunten dynasty in 1187.

Notes

References

See also
Tenson kōrin, a similar story in Japanese mythology

Asian dynasties
Japanese mythology
Ryukyuan monarchy